The Ministry of Culture is one of the ministries of the Government of Moldova. The current minister is Sergiu Prodan. He has raised complaints due to the neglectance of culture in the Moldovan Government and the low salaries that the workers of the Ministry of Culture receive, specifying that in 2022 they would increase.

Ministers

References

External links
 

Government ministries of Moldova
Culture ministries